Kingsville may refer to:

Australia
Kingsville, Victoria

Canada
Kingsville, Nova Scotia
Kingsville, Ontario

United States
Kingsville, California
Kingsville, Maryland
Kingsville, Missouri
Kingsville, Ohio
Kingsville, Texas